The PHL-16, also known as PCL-191, is a truck-mounted self-propelled multiple rocket launcher (MRL) system developed by the People's Republic of China.

Development
It is based on the AR-3 MRL developed by Norinco. The AR-3 was marketed in 2010. The PHL-16 was unveiled during the Chinese National Day Parade in 2019; unlike other rocket systems in the parade, the vehicles were unlabelled.

Design 
The launcher vehicles are operated in a firepower battery. The system also capable of autonomous operation. A typical battery includes six launcher vehicles, several reloading vehicles, command post vehicle, meteorological survey vehicle and other service support vehicles.

Rockets

Unlike the earlier PHL-03, which is loaded with a fixed type of ammunition, the new PHL-16 has two modularized launch cells, which can carry different types of ammunition. Each launch cell can carry either five 300 mm rockets or four 370 mm rockets. The export version of the new multiple rocket launcher, the AR-3, can even switch to the 750 mm Fire Dragon 480 tactical ballistic missile and 380 mm TL-7B anti-ship missile. This capability is possibly transferred to the PLA variants.

The configuration displayed during the 2019 National Day Parade was with 8 370 mm rockets.

Chassis
The vehicle chassis is based on the 45 ton WS2400 8×8 special wheeled vehicle chassis.

Operational history
In February 2023, PHL-16 was observed in deployment by 73rd Group Army of the Eastern Theatre Command, which responsible for the Taiwan Strait area.

Variants
AR-3 Baseline; first marketed in 2010.
PHL-16 Development for the People's Liberation Army

Operators

 People's Liberation Army Ground Force – 50+ units as of 2021.

References 

Military vehicles introduced in the 2010s
Modular rocket launchers
Multiple rocket launchers
Norinco
Self-propelled artillery of the People's Republic of China
Wheeled self-propelled rocket launchers